Scottish football clubs have participated in European association football competitions since 1955, when Hibernian entered the inaugural European Cup.

Scottish sides have won four UEFA competitions between them, with Celtic becoming the first side from the British Isles to be European champions by winning the 1966–67 European Cup. Rangers (in 1972) and Aberdeen (in 1983) both won the Cup Winners' Cup before its abolition, with Aberdeen going on to become the only Scottish side to win the European Super Cup in the same year as their Cup Winners' Cup triumph.

The most recent appearance by a Scottish club in a European final was the 2022 UEFA Europa League Final, when Rangers lost on penalties to German club Eintracht Frankfurt.

A number of non-top flight sides have represented Scotland in European competition, including Gretna and Queen of the South, via their performance in domestic cup competitions. The most recent side from outside the top level of Scottish football to play in European football was Hibernian in 2016–17.

Scottish clubs have never faced off in European tournaments at any stage; the closest this came to occurring was in the 1965–66 Inter-Cities Fairs Cup when Hearts lost a playoff to Zaragoza with Dunfermline already drawn to meet the winners in the next round, and in the same competition two years later when, knowing Dundee would be the next opponent, Rangers were eliminated by eventual winners Leeds United.

Qualification
The 2020–21 criteria for Scottish clubs to qualify for European competition are:

If the Scottish Cup winners have already qualified for European football, then 3rd and 4th in the Scottish Premiership move up to take their place and 5th in the Scottish Premiership also qualifies.

UEFA Coefficient

* Season in progress

Finals
Scottish clubs have competed in all three major European finals – twice in the European Cup, four times in the UEFA Cup / UEFA Europa League and four times in the UEFA Cup Winners' Cup.

European Cup / Champions League

UEFA Cup / Europa League

Cup Winners' Cup

Finals at Hampden
Six European club finals not involving native clubs have taken place in Scotland; all were held at Hampden Park, and all were won by either a Spanish or a German club.
The first, the 1960 European Cup Final, drew the highest ever attendance (127,621) to a UEFA competition final and is also the highest scoring, with Real Madrid running up a 7–3 victory over Eintracht Frankfurt.

Scottish teams were eliminated at the semi-final stage in 1960 (Rangers) and 1966 (Celtic), and on both occasions the Scottish club involved went on to reach the final of a different European competition the following year. Hampden's two finals in the 2000s were also each followed by a Scottish team reaching a European final the next season after even longer waits: a hiatus of 26 years between Scotland hosting such events ended with the 2002 Champions League Final, before Celtic played in the 2003 UEFA Cup Final 33 years after their previous showpiece appearance, while the 2007 UEFA Cup final in Glasgow immediately preceded Rangers' appearance in the same tournament in 2008, having waited 36 years since their last final. A similar situation occurred in the early 2020s: the UEFA Euro 2020 international tournament, including four matches at Hampden, was delayed for a year and played in 2021. In the season after that, Rangers reached the 2022 UEFA Europa League Final.

Full European record

European Cup/Champions League
European Cup era

Champions League era

 Club was transferred into the UEFA Cup or UEFA Europa League.
 Club progressed into the knockout phase of the UEFA Champions League.

UEFA Cup/Europa League
UEFA Cup era

Europa League era

 Club was transferred into the UEFA Europa League knockout phase after finishing third in their UEFA Champions League group.
 Club progressed from the group stage into the knockout phase of the UEFA Europa League.

UEFA Europa Conference League
Europa Conference League

 Club was transferred into the UEFA Europa Conference League Group Stage after losing their UEFA Europe League Play-off round match.
 Club progressed from the Europa League group stage into the knockout phase of the UEFA Europa Conference League.

UEFA Intertoto Cup
Between 1995 and 2008, UEFA ran the Intertoto Cup, a summer competition for sides that had not qualified for the other European competitions with the sides progressing the furthest qualifying for the UEFA Cup (it had operated independently since the 1960s, but no clubs from Scotland – among other nations – took part in that era). Scottish clubs were only involved five times, with Hibernian being the closest side to qualify for the UEFA Cup through this tournament, losing on away goals in the 2006 edition. The competition was abolished in 2008, with sides who would have entered the competition entering the UEFA Europa League instead.

Cup Winners' Cup
A single Scottish club was entered into the UEFA Cup Winners' Cup throughout its history – usually the winners of the Scottish Cup. In years in which the Scottish Cup holders had already qualified for the European Cup or Champions League, the other finalist would be entered in their place. For the 1983–84 edition, two Scottish sides were entered – Rangers as Scottish Cup runners-up and Aberdeen as the holders of the competition (and the Scottish Cup). The Cup Winners' Cup was merged with the UEFA Cup in 1999.

Super Cup
Only two Scottish clubs have competed in the UEFA Super Cup since its creation, with Rangers and Aberdeen both competing as winners of the Cup Winners' Cup.

Inter-Cities Fairs Cup
The Inter-Cities Fairs Cup, set up to promote international trade fairs, was played between 1955 and 1971, although no Scottish teams entered until the 1960–61 edition which was the first to be completed over a single season. The competition was initially only open to teams from cities that hosted trade fairs and where these teams finished in their national league had no relevance, therefore the number of entrants varied each year, and at times was restricted to one per city (Clyde were denied entry to the 1967–68 competition when they finished in 3rd place in the Scottish League, as Rangers finished above them and were given the single Fairs Cup place for Glasgow; the Bully Wee never played in Europe). After 1968, it was sometimes referred to as the Runners-up Cup, with teams now qualifying based on league position. In 1971, it came under the auspices of UEFA and was replaced by the UEFA Cup. UEFA does not consider clubs' records in the Fairs Cup to be part of their European record; however, FIFA does view the competition as a major honour.

No Scottish team reached the final of the Fairs Cup, although four different clubs reached the semi-finals, including Kilmarnock in 1966–67, the same season as Celtic and Rangers both reached the finals of the other continental tournaments and Scotland defeated England at Wembley. It was  Leeds United who ended Kilmarnock's dream, and in the following 1967–68 edition, the Yorkshire club eliminated three Scottish teams in successive rounds on their way to winning the cup – Hibernian in Round Three (2–1 on aggregate), Rangers in the quarter-final (2–0) and Dundee in the semi-final (2–1). The next year, Rangers made the semi-final but again were eliminated by an English opponent who went on to lift the trophy, this time Newcastle United.

Overall club record

Intercontinental Cup
Before being supplanted by the FIFA Club World Cup, the now defunct Intercontinental Cup served as a de facto annual world club championship contested by the European and South American club champions. The only Scottish side to have competed in the competition was Celtic in 1967, following their European Cup win.

Scottish Challenge Cup
The 2016–17 Scottish Challenge Cup saw the addition of four non-Scottish league sides for the first time. The competition, usually involving sides from the national divisions below the top flight, introduced top two teams from the Welsh Premier League and Northern Ireland's NIFL Premiership entered the competition in the fourth round. Welsh champions The New Saints progressed furthest of the four, being defeated in the semi-finals by St Mirren. The 2017–18 competition saw two League of Ireland sides compete along with two from Wales and Northern Ireland. This time the guest teams entered in the second round, with TNS and Crusaders both reaching the semi-finals. The 2018–19 edition was expanded again, this time to include two teams from the English fifth tier National League along with the teams from the other Celtic nations.

See also
List of football matches between British clubs in UEFA competitions
Lisbon Lions (1967)
The Bhoys from Seville (2003)
2008 UEFA Cup Final riots (2008)
Lincoln Red Imps 1–0 Celtic (2016)
Progrès Niederkorn 2–0 Rangers (2017)

References

 
European football clubs in international competitions